Roy Hamilton III (born in Queens, New York) is an American Grammy nominated/multi-award-winning music producer, songwriter and Berklee College of Music graduate. Best known as a Pop, Christian Gospel, and R&B songwriter and record producer. He is also the grandson of the legendary American singer Roy Hamilton Sr. Best known for hit songs like, "You'll Never Walk Alone", "Unchained Melody”, "You Can Have Her” and many more.

Hamilton scored his first Number 1 Billboard Hot 100 hit when he co-wrote and co-produced "Stutter" for Multi-platinum R&B singer Joe. In 2002 Hamilton executive produced the Keith Sweat album Rebirth, which debuted at No. 7 on the Billboard R&B Charts. Working largely with his brother, Raphael Hamilton & Anthony M. Jones, Hamilton has worked with acts such as Michael Jackson, Britney Spears, Samantha Mumba & 'NSYNC.

In 2004 Hamilton was hired as the Director of A&R for Capitol Records in Hollywood, California becoming the youngest African-American record label executive in the history of the company. During his years at Capitol Records, he assisted Andy Slater & Steve Prudholme in signing and releasing many acts including MIMS & J. Holiday. In 2006 Hamilton was hired by long-time friend Adrienne Bailon as musical director for her Cheetah Girls 2 summer world tour. That tour is their highest-grossing tour to date. Most recently he has co-produced "Last Time", the third single from Canadian pop star George Nozuka's hit album, Believe. "Last Time" peaked at No. 1 on the Much Music DAILY 10 after only being released a few months before.

Production career
In 2001, Hamilton began to study under Teddy Riley crafting a No. 1 hit, "Stutter". Also "Shout" for Michael Jackson. In 2004 During a two-week period in Los Angeles, Hamilton & Britney Spears worked closely for In the Zone album. During the same year Capitol Records signed Hamilton as Director Of A&R, making him the youngest African-American executive in the companies history. Since 2002 Roy has also been instrumental in developing songwriters, as well as producers, like Tommy Brown (record producer) ("Just Can't Get Enough", The Black Eyed Peas), Rob A! (“Disturbia” -Rihanna) and The Jackie Boyz (“Eenie Meenie” -Justin Bieber).

In 2006, Hamilton worked closely with Kenneth "Babyface" Edmonds producing songs for Kristinia Debarge, The Cheetah Girls and many others. In 2008 Hamilton was a new mentor with a new joint venture at Asylum Records/Warner Music Group. He also worked closely with Pras Michel. They worked together on several projects, including Experience Magic. Hamilton was credited as Co-Executive producer. He was also co-producer for Keri Hilson's track "Can You Do It" which samples "My Jamaican Guy" and has taken very positive feedback as a future single. In 2009 Hamilton Co-wrote and Co-Produced "Its Gotta Be Love" for Kristinia DeBarge  Hamilton also co-produced the song "Number One" by R. Kelly, featuring Keri Hilson.
 
In 2010, Hamilton contributed two cast songs "Blush" and "Dreams" to Standing Ovation The Musical Movie produced by James Brolin written and directed by Stewart Raffill. The soundtrack for Standing Ovation was released by Kenliworth Films on May 25, 2010, on AmazonMP3.

In 2015, Hamilton produced and co-wrote Ana Golja's recording of "I Feel So Good" for the Full Out soundtrack. Full Out, also known as Full Out: The Ariana Berlin Movie, is a 2016 drama young-adult TV movie based on the life story of American gymnast Ariana Berlin.

In 2018, Hamilton wrote and arranged "Warriors with Warren Dean Flandez for the gospel crossover album Speak, which debuted at #1 on the iTunes Inspirational charts and #20 on the iTunes overall charts Top 100. Speak won the GMA Covenant Gospel Music Awards for Album of The Year.

In 2020, Roy signed an exclusive agreement with the U.S.A./Canada based record label, The Singer's Company Inc., as the Director of A&R to develop their emerging music artists internationally.

Production discography

Singles

Contributions to full-length albums and compilation albums

Special projects: Television and film

Unreleased projects

Charts

References

Record producers from New York (state)
African-American songwriters
Songwriters from New York (state)
Living people
Year of birth missing (living people)
21st-century African-American people